Fuat Mansurov (January 10, 1928 – June 12, 2010) was a Soviet and Russian conductor.

Biography 
Mansurov was born on 10 January 1928 in Almaty, Kazakhstan. He graduated from Al-Farabi University in Almaty, Kazakhstan in 1950 as a mathematician and then became a faculty member of the School of Math and Sciences there.

In 1951 Mansurov graduated from Kurmangazy Kazakh National Conservatory in Almaty, as a conductor. While at Kurmangazy Conservatory, he studied under Achmet Kujanowitsch Schubanow and Isidor Zach and then took his Doctoral studies at the Moscow Conservatory under Leo Ginzburg. Then Mansurov became an assistant conductor to Igor Markevitch.

Career 
Between 1949 - 1952 Mansurov was a conductor of the Kurmangazy Kazakh Orchestra of Folk Instruments and then he became a conductor of Kazakh Radio Symphony Orchestra. Since 1951 Mansurov became a faculty member of the Kurmangazy Kazakh National Conservatory in Almaty.

In 1958 Mansurov became a founding member of the Kazakh National Symphony Orchestra. He held a position of Music Director and Principal Conductor with this orchestra till 1962. With this orchestra, Mansurov toured Germany, Poland, and Italy.

Between 1953 - 1956 and then between 1963 - 1968 Mansurov worked as an opera and ballet conductor of the Abay Opera House. In 1966 he won the second All-Union Conductors Competition.

Since 1968 Mansurov became a Principal Conductor and Artistic Director of the Tatar State Academic Opera and Ballet Theatre named after Musa Cälil. Since 1969 Mansurov became a conductor of Moscow Bolshoi Theatre.

In 1970 Mansurov became a Professor of Moscow Conservatory and in 1986 became a Professor of Kazan Conservatory in Kazan. From 1989 and till his death in 2010, Mansurov was a Principal Conductor and Music Director of Tatar State Symphony Orchestra in Kazan.

He was a People's Artist of Russia, Tatarstan, and Kazakhstan.

In 1991 Mansurov conducted the Bolshoi at the New York Metropolitan Opera for performances of Mlada and Eugene Onegin.

Death 
He died, aged 82, in Moscow.

References

External links 
 Version for Oboe and String Orchestra; State Symphony of Tatarstan, conductor Fuat Mansurov.
 of  Modest Mussorgsky's 150 anniversary in Bolshoi Theatre, conductor Fuat Mansurov.

1928 births
2010 deaths
People from Almaty
Russian conductors (music)
Russian male conductors (music)
Kazakhstani musicians
Tatar people of Russia
People's Artists of Russia
Al-Farabi Kazakh National University alumni
Academic staff of Kazan Conservatory
Musicians from Tatarstan
Burials in Troyekurovskoye Cemetery
Bolshoi Theatre
Tatar people of the Soviet Union